The Old Town Hall in the UNESCO World Heritage town of Levoča (Slovakia) was originally built in the 15th century, and stands in the town's main square. 

The original gothic building was destroyed in 1550 during a fire which ravaged the town, and only fragments of the original walls were preserved. It was further damaged by a fire in 1599. The town hall in its existing form was built in 1615 in a Renaissance style, with arcades on the ground and first floors, and a belfry was added in 1656–61. Wall-paintings on the southern facade represent the virtues of moderation, care, bravery, patience and justice. The whole was later reconstructed in 1893–95.

The building is now maintained by the Spiš Museum, Levoča  a department of the Slovak National Museum. It contains the original town council chamber and a variety of exhibits relating to the town's history, including a popular 19th-century painting of the "White Lady", (1680-1714) who according to (inaccurate) legend betrayed the town to troops of the Austrian Empire in the early 18th century.

References

Notes

Sources
 Lacika, Ján (1999). Spiš. Bratislava: Dajama 

Levoča
Levoča
Levoča
Levoča
Levoča
Levoča
Buildings and structures in Levoča
1615 establishments in the Habsburg monarchy
17th-century establishments in Hungary